Bernard II (c. 995 – 29 June 1059) was the Duke of Saxony between 1011 and 1059, the third of the Billung dynasty as a son of Bernard I and Hildegard.  Besides his position in Saxony, he had the rights of a count in Frisia.

Bernard expanded the powers of the duke in Saxony and is regarded as the greatest of the Billungers. He was originally a supporter of Holy Roman Emperor Henry II, and he accompanied him into Poland to negotiate the Peace of Bautzen of 1018. In 1019–1020, however, he revolted against Henry and gained the recognition of the tribal laws of Saxony, something his father had failed to do. He then returned to war with the Obodrites and Lutici (two Slavic tribes) and drew them into his sphere of influence through their leader Gottschalk.

He supported Holy Roman Emperor Conrad II in 1024 and Conrad's son Henry III, though he began to fear the latter for his closeness to the Archbishop Adalbert of Bremen, whom he considered a spy and inveterate enemy of the dukes of Saxony. Although he was a critical ally of the Danes, who provided fundamental support for Henry's wars in the Low Countries, Bernard was on the brink of rebellion until the death of Adalbert. The remainder of his reign, however, was quiet.

In 1045, he erected the Alsterburg in Hamburg. He died in 1059 and was succeeded without incident by his son Ordulf. He is buried in the Church of Saint Michael in Lüneburg.

Marriage and issue
Bernard II, Duke of Saxony married to Eilika of Schweinfurt, daughter of Henry of Schweinfurt. They had these children together: 
Gertrude of Saxony (c. 1030 – August 4, 1113), married firstly to Floris I, Count of Holland, secondly to Robert I, Count of Flanders
Ordulf, Duke of Saxony (c. 1020 – March 28, 1072), who married Ulfhilde or Wulfhilde of Norway (c. 1023 – May 24, 1070), daughter of King Olaf II (St.Olaf) of Norway and his wife Queen Astrid
Hermann
Ida of Saxony, who married Albert III, Count of Namur

References

Sources

990s births
1059 deaths
Bernhard 02
House of Billung
Burials at the Church of Saint Michael, Lüneburg
11th-century Saxon people

Year of birth uncertain